Macomb Farm, also known as the Thomas Irons House, is a historic home located at Dover, Kent County, Delaware. It dates to the 18th century, and is a two-story, brick dwelling.  It has a brick wing extending the original house. The interior is arranged according to the so-called Quaker or Penn plan.

It was added to the National Register of Historic Places in 1974.

References

Houses on the National Register of Historic Places in Delaware
Houses in Dover, Delaware
National Register of Historic Places in Dover, Delaware